Paolo Simion (born 10 October 1992) is an Italian professional racing cyclist, who currently rides for UCI Continental team . He rode in the 2016 Giro d'Italia.

Major results
2012
 1st Circuito del Porto
2013
 1st Circuito del Porto
 1st Stage 5 Giro della Regione Friuli Venezia Giulia
2014
 4th Gran Premio della Liberazione
 10th Memorial Gianni Biz
 10th Alta Padovana Tour
2016
 3rd Coppa Bernocchi
 6th London–Surrey Classic
2018
 1st Stage 6 Tour of Croatia
 3rd Coppa Bernocchi

Grand Tour general classification results timeline

References

External links
 

1992 births
Living people
Italian male cyclists
People from Castelfranco Veneto
Cyclists from the Province of Treviso